Carl Valentin Lehrmann (born 11 March 1992 in Odense) is a Danish politician, who is a member of the Folketing for the Socialist People's Party. He was elected into parliament at the 2019 Danish general election.

Political career
From 25 October 2017 to 10 November 2017 Valentin was a substitute member of the Folketing, substituting for Karsten Hønge He was elected into parliament on his own mandate at the 2019 election, where he received 2,074 votes.

References

External links 
 Biography on the website of the Danish Parliament (Folketinget)

1992 births
Living people
People from Odense
Socialist People's Party (Denmark) politicians
Members of the Folketing 2019–2022
Members of the Folketing 2022–2026